Epictinae (commonly called slender blind snakes or threadsnakes) are a subfamily of snakes found in the New World and equatorial Africa.  Members of this subfamily tend to have short, thick tails, and the fewest subcaudal scales. It comprises two tribes, three subtribes, ten genera, and 86 species.

Taxonomy

 Tribe Epictini, New World snakes 
 Subtribe Epictina
 Genus Epictia [Gray, 1845] (43 species)
 Genus Habrophallos [Martins, Koch, Pinto, Folly, Fouquet, & Passos, 2020] collared blind snake
 Genus Siagonodon [Peters, 1881] (4 species)
 Subtribe Renina
 Genus Rena [Baird & Girard, 1853] (10 species)
 Genus Trilepida [Hedges, 2011] (14 species)
 Subtribe Tetracheilostomina
 Genus Mitophis [Hedges, Adalsteinsson & Branch, 2009] (4 species)
 Genus Tetracheilostoma [Jan, 1861] (3 species)
 Tribe Rhinoleptini, African snakes
 Genus Tricheilostoma [Jan, 1860] (5 species)
 Genus Rhinoleptus [Orejas-Miranda, Roux-Estève & Guibé, 1970] Villiers's blind snake
 Genus Rhinoguinea [Trape, 2014] Rhinoguinea magna

Description

Distribution
The subfamily is distributed in the New World and in equatorial Africa. In the New World it
ranges from North America (California, Utah, and Kansas) south through Middle and South America
(exclusive of the high Andes) to Uruguay and Argentina on the Atlantic side. It also occurs on San Salvador
Island (Bahamas), Hispaniola, the Lesser Antilles, Cozumel Island (Mexico), Islas de Bahia and Swan Islands
(Honduras), San Andres and Providencia Islands (Colombia), Bonaire, Margarita Islands, and Trinidad. It also
occurs in equatorial Africa, from southern Senegal, Guinea, and Bioko Island in the west to Ethiopia in the
east.

References

 
Taxa named by Stephen Blair Hedges
Taxa named by Solny A. Adalsteinsson
Taxa named by William Roy Branch